Local elections to the West Midlands County Council, a Metropolitan County Council encompassing the West Midlands, were held on 7 May 1981, resulting in large swings to Labour, giving them control of the council.

This was the last election to the West Midlands County Council, after metropolitan county councils were scrapped on 31 March 1986 under the Local Government Act 1985 by the Conservative government of Margaret Thatcher. The councils' abolition followed several high profile clashes between mostly Labour metropolitan county councils and the Conservative government over issues, including spending and rates charges.

Results

Council composition
After the election the composition of the council was:

Borough summary

|- class="unsortable" align="centre"
!rowspan=2 align="left"|Borough
! % 
!Cllrs
! %
!Cllrs
! %
!Cllrs
! %
!Cllrs
! %
!Cllrs
! %
!Cllrs
!rowspan=2|TotalCllrs
|- class="unsortable" align="center"
!colspan=2 bgcolor="" | Labour
!colspan=2 bgcolor=""| Conservative
!colspan=2 bgcolor="" | Liberal
!colspan=2 bgcolor="" | Green
!colspan=2 bgcolor="white"| Independent
!colspan=2 bgcolor="white"| Others
|-
|align="left"|Birmingham
|bgcolor="#EEA2AD"|49.7
|bgcolor="#EEA2AD"|30
|35.0
|9
|12.4
|3
|0.8
|0
|0.1
|0
|2.0
|0
|42
|-
|align="left"|Coventry
|bgcolor="#EEA2AD"|49.3
|bgcolor="#EEA2AD"|9
|37.1
|3
|12.3
|0
|0.0
|0
|0.0
|0
|1.4
|0
|12
|-
|align="left"|Dudley
|bgcolor="#EEA2AD"|57.2
|bgcolor="#EEA2AD"|9
|40.2
|2
|1.7
|0
|0.7
|0
|0.0
|0
|0.2
|0
|11
|-
|align="left"|Sandwell
|bgcolor="#EEA2AD"|60.5
|bgcolor="#EEA2AD"|9
|28.9
|1
|9.9
|2
|0.0
|0
|0.0
|0
|0.7
|0
|12
|-
|align="left"|Solihull
|31.8
|2
|bgcolor="lightblue"|46.1
|bgcolor="lightblue"|5
|12.6
|0
|0.5
|0
|0.0
|0
|9.0
|0
|7
|-
|align="left"|Walsall
|bgcolor="#EEA2AD"|44.1
|bgcolor="#EEA2AD"|7
|35.0
|3
|10.3
|0
|0.0
|0
|3.8
|0
|6.8
|0
|10
|-
|align="left"|Wolverhampton
|bgcolor="#EEA2AD"|53.0
|bgcolor="#EEA2AD"|8
|42.1
|2
|3.4
|0
|0.0
|0
|0.7
|0
|0.9
|0
|8
|- class="unsortable" class="sortbottom" style="background:#C9C9C9"
|align="left"| Total
|50.0
|74
|36.7
|25
|9.8
|5
|0.5
|0
|0.4
|0
|2.5
|0
|104
|-
|}

References

1981 English local elections
1981